Mina is an unincorporated community and a census-designated place (CDP) in Edmunds County, in the U.S. state of South Dakota. The population of the CDP was 554 at the 2020 census.

Demographics

History
A post office called Mina was established in 1909, and remained in operation until 1983. The community most likely was named after Mina Erling, the daughter of a railroad official.

1999 Learjet crash

In 1999, a Learjet carrying PGA golfer Payne Stewart and five other people (including two pilots and three passengers) crashed in a field about a mile south of Mina. All were already dead from a lack of oxygen long before the crash.

References

Unincorporated communities in Edmunds County, South Dakota
Unincorporated communities in South Dakota